The Toyota Stout is a light truck produced by the Japanese automaker Toyota from 1954 through 1989. The Stout shared its platform with the Toyota Dyna until 1968, when the Dyna was given its own platform, called the Toyota "U". In Japan, it was sold at Toyota Japanese dealerships called Toyopet Store.



First generation (1954-1960)

Introduced in April 1954 as the Toyopet RK 1¼ ton truck, it was larger than the similar Toyota SG light truck but smaller than the Toyota FA medium duty truck. In 1955 it was upgraded to carry 1.5 tons.

The standard body was a 2-door, 3 seater pickup with a separate well body (with a fold down tailgate). Other bodies advertised by Toyota included a van, an ambulance, double cab coupé utility (2-doors, 6 seater, integral well body), drop-side pickup, pickup with stake sides, a pickup with full height metal side with a canvas top, a light bus (precursor to the Coaster) and an ice cream van.

All models used mechanicals common to new vehicles of its time, such as a ladder frame chassis, leaf springs, solid axles and 4 wheel drum brakes. The body was professionally finished with windscreen wipers, dual outside mirrors (1955 onwards), hubcaps, chrome trim and dual headlights.

The 1954 model was designated as a 1¼-ton truck but was actually rated to carry . The 1955 model was designated as a 1.5-ton truck but was actually rated to carry .

In 1957 the RK was revised to become the RK30 and the RK35. In May 1959 it was named the Stout. Its main competitor was the Nissan Junior. The Stout was assembled in Toyota Shatai's Koromo Plant, which was renamed the Honsha Plant in August 1960.

Second generation (1960-1978)

Completely redesigned in 1960, this is the most familiar version of the Stout. The Japanese market had the 1,453 cc Type R engine in the RK45 and the 1,897 cc 3R-B engine in the RK100, which was introduced in October 1962. Along with the new optional engine, the Stout also underwent a facelift, including twin headlights. In September 1963 there also appeared a shorter and lighter duty (type RK40) model called "Light Stout", which featured independent coil sprung front suspension for a more carlike ride. This was meant to compete directly with Nissan's Datsun minitrucks, but it never sold particularly well in its home market and was replaced by the Briska and Hilux following Toyota's takeover of Hino Motors.

Conventional mechanical parts were used in the form of leaf springs and four-wheel drum brakes on a ladder frame chassis. Body styles include a pickup (two-door, three seater), a double-cab pickup (four-door, six seater) and a two-door panel van. Trucks were built in Toyota Shatai's Honsha Plant, while the vans were assembled by Arakawa Auto Body Industries (also in Honsha).

The Stout was Toyota's launch model in South Africa in 1961. It sold well until its discontinuation in 1979. The RK45 Stout was the first Toyota to begin complete knock-down assembly in South Africa, in 1962. South African production later switched to the two-litre RK101 series, available as a flush-side pickup, a dropside, or a chassis/cab. South African Stouts kept using a simplified version of the original bed, even after the longer cabin had been introduced, as they were not affected by Japanese regulations on overall length. Bed length was thus , marginally longer than elsewhere. Between 1961 and 1975, 17,500 Stouts were sold in South Africa - the majority of them assembled locally.

A version of the Lite Stout, equipped with the 1.9 litre 3R engine was sold in North America as the Stout 1900 between 1964 and 1969. During its first year in the American market, a total of 4 units were sold. This Lite Stout model was assembled in South Africa as well, beginning in 1965. It was called the Toyota Stallion there to distinguish it from the original model with its solid front axle, and also marked the introduction of the larger cabin to this market. This generation Stout was also assembled in Thailand, beginning in 1964.

In order to stay under the Japanese maximum length of  this required the design of a new rear bed for the long wheelbase versions, while the shorter models instead received a correspondingly lengthened wheelbase to accommodate the longer cab. With the introduction of the slightly larger 2R engine, the Lite Stout became the RK43, while the 1.75 ton 1500 became the RK47. There was also the RK47P, a one-tonne six-seater medium duty version with the same  2R engine. Another update and facelift occurred in September 1967 with the introduction of the RK101. This also spelled the end of all 1.5-litre models for Japan, although they continued to be available in export markets. In some markets (e.g. North America) the Stout was replaced by the slightly smaller Hilux in 1969 but in many other markets (e.g. South-East Asia and Australia) it was sold alongside the Hilux as a heavier-duty alternative.

The RK101 used the 1994 cc 5R engine. Its  in Japanese trim, combined with low gearing for higher load capacity, provided a top speed of only . The engine displacement remained under  2.0 litres so as to offer Japanese buyers some tax advantages when it came time to pay the Japanese annual road tax. The South African RK101 claimed  SAE at 5200 rpm. Export models to DIN specifications claimed .

Third generation (K110; 1979-2000)

Facelifted and modernised in March 1979, the 1.5-ton Stout now used the front pressings of the smaller Hilux but still fulfilled the same role as before. The bed used the same pressings as for the previous Stouts, meaning that there was a pronounced difference between the front and rear bodywork. The RK110 also continued to use the same 1,994 cc 5R engine. Toyota themselves state that export versions were available with the 2.2 litre 20R engine, but this is in contradiction to their own parts catalogues which only include the 5R and the 4Y. The Stout underwent a light facelift in January 1982 and became the RK111, still fitted with the 5R engine.

Body styles included a pickup (two-door, three-seater) and a double-cab pickup (four-door six-seater). The Stout was cancelled in 1989 without a successor, as Toyota's first full-size pickup, the T100 (as well as the later Tundra) were built mainly for North America, where the Stout had been replaced by the Hilux in 1968. In Japan, the third generation Stout saw very limited sales, as trucks in this weight class were nearly always of a cab-over design. Most third generation Stouts were exported. The double cab version was retired in July 1985. Stout production for Japan came to a final halt in March 1989, although production for export continued until February 2000. From September 1986, a new version (YK110) appeared in export markets (mainly Latin America), fitted with the 2.2-liter 4Y engine.

References

External links

Stout
Pickup trucks
Vehicles introduced in 1954